Wang Jian (766?–831?) was a Chinese poet of the Tang dynasty. One of his poems is included in the famous anthology Three Hundred Tang Poems.

Biography 
Wang Jian was born around 766.

He died around 831.

Poetry 
Wang Jian had one poem collected in Three Hundred Tang Poems, which was translated by Witter Bynner as "A Bride". He was also known to write in the rare six-syllable line, which is characterized by the presence of two caesuras per line, dividing each line into three parts of two syllables each.

One of Wang's poems was adapted in the Tune of Li Zhongtang by Li Hongzhang for use as an unofficial national anthem in 1896, (the 22nd year of Guangxu) during a diplomatic visit to western Europe and Russia.

Notes

Works cited 
 Frankel, Hans H. (1978). The Flowering Plum and the Palace Lady. (New Haven and London: Yale University Press) 
 

 Watson, Burton (1971). CHINESE LYRICISM: Shih Poetry from the Second to the Twelfth Century. New York: Columbia University Press.

See also
Geng (dish)

External links 
 
Books of the Quan Tangshi that include collected poems of Wang Jian at the Chinese Text Project:
Book 297
Book 298
Book 299
Book 300
Book 301
Book 302

Three Hundred Tang Poems poets
760s births
830 deaths
Politicians from Xuchang
Poets from Henan
Tang dynasty politicians from Henan
8th-century Chinese poets
9th-century Chinese poets
Writers from Xuchang